Samuel E. Jones was a Welsh amateur footballer who played in the Football League for Newport County as an outside left. He was capped by Wales at amateur level.

References 

Welsh footballers
English Football League players
Wales amateur international footballers
Association football outside forwards
Year of birth missing
Place of birth missing
Year of death missing
Place of death missing
Newport County A.F.C. players
Lovell's Athletic F.C. players
Epsom & Ewell F.C. players